This is a list of Assamese and other regional language films produced by the film industry of Assam, India based in Guwahati and publicly released in the year 2016. Premiere shows and film festival screenings are not considered as releases for this list.

Scheduled releases

January - June

July - December

Non-theatrical releases

See also

 Cinema of Assam

References 

2016
Assamese
Assamese